Fasole cu cârnați ("beans with sausages") is a popular Romanian dish, consisting of baked beans and sausages. A variation replaces the sausages with afumătură (smoked meat).

Also a traditional Army dish, fasole cu cârnați is prepared by Army cooks and served freely to the crowds during the National Day celebrations (on 1 December) in Bucharest and Alba Iulia. The main ingredients for this dish are: beans, smoked pork, carrots, onions, tomatoes, parsnip, tomato sauce and bay leaf.

See also
 List of sausage dishes
 List of stews

References 

Romanian stews
Vegetable dishes
Sausage dishes